Gora is a Bengali drama film directed Naresh Mitra based on the 1909 novel of the same name by Rabindranath Tagore. This film was released on 30 July 1938. Music composer of the film was Kazi Nazrul Islam.

Plot
Gora and Mahim were two sons of Krishna Dayal. Binay, Gora's childhood friend was introduced him to a Brahma family. Gora is very conscious about his Hinduism and he like to represent himself as an orthodox Hindu. His Hinduism makes conflict with Brahma religion.

Cast
 Naresh Mitra as Haranbabu 
 Jiban Ganguly as Gora
 Mohan Ghoshal as Binay
 Manoranjan Bhattacharya as Paresh Babu
 Bipin Gupta as Krishnadayal
 Ranibala as Radharani a.k.a. Sucharita
 Protima Dasgupta as Lalita
 Rajlakshmi Devi as Anandomoyee
 Devbala as Haramohini
 Manorama as Baradasundari
 Suhasini Devi

References

External links
 

1938 films
Bengali-language Indian films
Films based on works by Rabindranath Tagore
Films set in the British Raj
1938 drama films
Indian black-and-white films
Films based on Indian novels
Brahmoism
Indian drama films
1930s Bengali-language films
Films directed by Naresh Mitra